Mutual Admiration Society is an album featuring the collaboration between Nickel Creek's Chris Thile, Sara Watkins, and Sean Watkins, and Glen Phillips, the former lead singer of folk-rock group Toad the Wet Sprocket. It was recorded in three days in December 2000, but took 3½ years to be released.

Track listing
"Comes a Time" (Phillips) – 4:07 
"Sake of the World" (Brion, Phillips) – 2:41
"Windmills" (Dining, Guss, Nichols, Phillips) – 4:30
"Be Careful" (Phillips) – 3:57
"Running Out" (Phillips) – 1:56
"Somewhere Out There" (Phillips) – 4:21
"Francesca" (Phillips) – 3:20
"Trouble" (Brion, McGregor) – 3:36
"La Lune" (Kennedy) – 4:18
"Reprise" (Kennedy) – 2:05
"Think About Your Troubles" (Nillsson) – 6:11

Personnel

Musical
Chris Thile - Mandolin, Vocals, Group Member  
Sara Watkins - Fiddle, Vocals, Group Member  
Sean Watkins - Guitar, Mandolin, Vocals, Group Member
Glen Phillips - Vocals, Group Member
Ethan Johns - Mandolin, Percussion, Guitar (Electric), Vocals (background), Producer, Engineer, Mixing  
Richard Causon - Piano, Accordion, Organ (Hammond)  
Jennifer Condos - Bass

Technical
Robert Hadley - Mastering  
Nickel Creek - Creative Director  
Glen Rose - Photography  
Doug Sax - Mastering  
Wendy Stamberger - Design, Creative Director

Chart listings

References

2004 albums
Nickel Creek albums
Sugar Hill Records albums